Pont-de-Metz is a commune in the Somme department in Hauts-de-France in northern France.

Geography

Population

Places of interest
 Church of Saint Cyr and Sainte-Julitte. Recently restored in the 21st century.
 The war memorial, at the entrance to the graveyard.

See also
Communes of the Somme department

References

External links

 Municipal website 

Communes of Somme (department)